Jam Rural District is in the Central District of Jam County, Bushehr province, Iran. At the census of 2006, its population was 14,417 in 2,870 households; there were 20,426 inhabitants in 5,412 households at the following census of 2011; and in the most recent census of 2016, the population of the rural district was 21,089 in 5,814 households. The largest of its 68 villages was Baharestan, with 5,989 people.

References 

Rural Districts of Bushehr Province
Populated places in Jam County